Rosanna Capolingua (born 1959) is an Australian doctor and former federal president of the Australian Medical Association (AMA).  She served as president from 2007 to 2009.

Background
A graduate of the University of Western Australia, she was AMA (Western Australia) State President for two years and served on the Executive of the Federal AMA for four years. Dr. Capolingua is also Chair of the Federal AMA's Ethics and Medico-Legal Committee and the AMA Publishing Company.

She currently works as a general practitioner in Western Australia. She occasionally writes newspaper columns for The West Australian.

Capolingua was once a member of the Liberal Party of Australia.

Capolingua was for a long time a board member of Healthway, a government-funded health promotion organisation, and served as its chairman for a period of time. She resigned from the role in February 2015 after a Public Sector Commission report found that she and other board members had misused privileges for their own personal benefit, including tickets to sports events provided by Healthway-sponsored teams.

Capolingua sued The West Australian for defamation following her resignation from the Healthway board. The case was settled, with The West Australian conceding that the statements made of Capolingua were defamatory.

Bob Cronin, the group editor-in-chief of West Australian News-papers, stated that, "The articles were published in circumstances where Dr Capolingua was (and still is) barred by statutory confidentiality obligations from disclosing information she obtained by reason of her role as Chair of Healthway, which prevented her from giving details of what went on at Healthway.”

“The West accepts that Dr Capolingua was instrumental in initiating the Public Sector Commission review into Healthway’s access to and use of tickets, and took action to address inappropriate inclusion of tickets in sponsorship agreements and ensuring Healthway’s practices complied with Public Sector guidelines,” Mr Cronin said.

Affiliations
Dr. Capolingua is a member of the:

 Medical Board of Western Australia, Professional Services Review Committee
 Board of MercyCare
 Director of General Practice Liaison at SJOG Hospital, Subiaco.

References

External links
http://www.mdanational.com.au/about/council.asp
http://www.medicalnewstoday.com/articles/72457.php

Australian general practitioners
Australian people of Italian descent
Living people
People from Perth, Western Australia
1959 births
University of Western Australia alumni